Kotli is a town in Pakistan-administered Kashmir.

Kotli may also refer to:
 Kotli District, centred on the town
 University of Kotli
 Kotli, Himachal Pradesh, a village in India
 Alar Kotli, Estonian architect

See also 
 
 Kotli Lions, a Pakistani cricket team